The Peninsular Railway (known to locals as the Pin) was an interurban electrified railway in the U.S. State of California in the United States of America. It served the area between San Jose, Los Gatos, and Palo Alto, comprising much of what is today known as "Silicon Valley".  For much of its existence it was a subsidiary of the Southern Pacific Railroad.

History

San Jose, Saratoga & Los Gatos Electric Railway (1900–1909) 

The Peninsular Railway was incorporated in January 1906 as a subsidiary of the Southern Pacific in response to calls for an interurban line from San Francisco to San Jose. In addition  to the line to Los Gatos, branches were also planned to extend to Alviso, Oakland and Lick Observatory. However, due to the Colorado River flood of 1905 (which created the Salton Sea), many of the rails to be used for this construction had to be rushed to the Imperial Valley to rebuild the Southern Pacific line between Los Angeles and Yuma, Arizona. Therefore, only the lines connecting San Jose, Palo Alto and Los Gatos were constructed, and interurban service did not exist between Palo Alto and San Mateo. Another attempt to complete this line came in the next decade, but construction was again delayed by a scarcity of steel rails, this time due to World War I.

Before the Peninsular Railway had built any track or started running interurban operations, F.S. Granger and J.W. Rea, who owned the San Jose Los Gatos Interurban Company, sold their tracks to the Pin to avoid competing with a company backed by the Southern Pacific. The original Pin tracks were from several other already existing interurban companies, such as the Alum Rock Railway Company, the Peninsular Railroad, and the Santa Clara Interurban Railroad. Some of the Peninsular Railroad and Alum Rock Railway trackage in San Jose became owned by the San Jose Railroads and were never a part of the Peninsular Railway.

The trackage that the Peninsular Railway built itself was the line to Los Gatos through Campbell, the line along Stevens Creek Road to Cupertino, the two lines along the Mayfield cutoff from Cupertino to Mayfield, and Cupertino to Los Gatos, the spur to Congress Springs from Saratoga, and part of the line to Alum Rock Park.

Peninsular Railway (1906–1934) 

Electric passenger service between San Jose and Palo Alto began on March 5, 1910, and ended on October 1, 1934. All of the lines were replaced by bus service by the late 1930s.

Physical infrastructure 
The properties of the Peninsular Railway included everything owned by the companies it acquired as well as necessary tracks, substations, and a interurban carbarn in San Jose. The carbarn faced San Carlos street at the southwest corner of San Carlos and Sunol streets, by 1920, the  system had several main tracks originating in San Jose.

San José 

Interurban services

The primary route for all interurban trains began at a loop around Julian, Old Market, and Bassett streets in front of the original Southern Pacific Railroad depot in San Jose. The Peninsular Railway had its own double track line down market street, which split into an eastbound and westbound pair of tracks going west on San Carlos street and Park avenue respectively. Trains west to Palo Alto or Saratoga would turn onto Meridian street and follow the dedicated right of way along San Carlos street, while trains south to Campbell and Los Gatos would turn onto Josefa and San Carlos streets until the double track route on Bird avenue.

Local services

The Naglee park local route had its own loop on San Fernando, 15th, and San Carlos streets.
The Bascom local route followed the main tracks west until San Carlos and Bascom, the dedicated right of way was double-tracked from Meridian until Bascom permitting extra local service.

Alum Rock line

The Peninsular Interurban owned a line from (North 10th Street and Madera Avenue) to Alum Rock Park on which it would run freight service and run passenger trains along with the San Jose Railroads.

Rural county 

Palo Alto

The Peninsular Railroad operated several local lines in and near Palo Alto, California along University Avenue, Waverly street, El Camino Real, and a track leased from Stanford University on the south side of Galvez st, and continued past the Stanford Stadium until Lasuen St, where it continued until turning west along Serra Mall ending at the Palm Drive Oval.

Other towns

The Peninsular Railway tracks serviced many other towns with regional hourly service including Los Altos, Cupertino, Saratoga, Los Gatos, and Campbell. The main tracks operating electric service were on Stevens Creek road (now Stevens Creek Boulevard), Saratoga road from Meridian corners (today Saratoga and Stevens Creek) to downtown Saratoga, the Mayfield cut-off from Mayfield to Congress Junction (along today's Foothill Expressway and California State Route 85), and a route looping through Willow Glen, Campbell, Los Gatos, and Saratoga with a winding path on various county roads. Stops typically had a shelter, as indicated by various historical photos.

Congress Springs branch

The Peninsular Railway also operated a branch line from downtown Saratoga going southwest along Big Basin Road, terminating at the Congress Hotel.

List of interurban services

Peninsular Railway cars 52 and 61 
These cars are all that's left of the Peninsular Railway. Both 52 and 61 are currently at the Western Railway Museum, and were two of twelve wooden cars operating for the San Jose Los Gatos Interurban Company. They were renumbered when the Peninsular Railway took over. The 52 is still operational , and is used for tourist excursions. It was restored to operating condition after spending many years in a backyard being used as a sewing room. The 61 was a trailer car and is currently awaiting restoration.

See also 
BART
Caltrain
List of California street railroads
San Jose Railroads
VTA Light Rail
Saratoga and Almaden Railroad

References

External links 
SAN JOSE/SANTA CLARA TRANSIT — Chicago Transit & Railfan via the Internet Archive
SAN JOSE/SANTA CLARA TRANSIT ROUTES — Chicago Transit & Railfan via the Internet Archive
The Peninsular Interurban – Saratoga’s Railroad — Saratoga Historical Foundation
Streetcars: San Jose and Los Gatos Interurban Railway Company — Santa Cruz Trains

Defunct California railroads
Interurban railways in California
Southern Pacific Railroad